Toner Historic District is a national historic district located at Edinburgh, Johnson County, Indiana. The district encompasses 66 contributing buildings in a predominantly residential section of Edinburgh. It developed between about 1845 and 1959, and includes notable examples of Gothic Revival, Italianate, Queen Anne, Colonial Revival, and Bungalow / American Craftsman style architecture.  The dwellings include a collection of substantial homes with high historic integrity. Notable buildings include the Edinburgh Presbyterian Church (1916), and former marble shop and weight house (c. 1880).

It was listed on the National Register of Historic Places in 2011.

References

Historic districts on the National Register of Historic Places in Indiana
Italianate architecture in Indiana
Gothic Revival architecture in Indiana
Colonial Revival architecture in Indiana
Queen Anne architecture in Indiana
Historic districts in Johnson County, Indiana
National Register of Historic Places in Johnson County, Indiana